Love Unlimited was a female vocal trio that provided backing vocals for American singer-songwriter Barry White on his albums and concert tours. They also found success with their own recordings.

Career
Formed in 1969, the group included Barry White's future wife, Glodean James; her sister, Linda James; and their cousin Diane Taylor (who died of cancer in Pomona, California on November 29, 1985 at age 38).

Their first hit was "Walkin' in the Rain with the One I Love" in 1972. It peaked at number 14 on the Billboard Hot 100, number 7 on the Cash Box Top 100, and 6 on the Best Selling Soul Singles Chart. It was also successful in the United Kingdom, peaking at number 14 on the UK Singles Chart. It sold over one million copies, and was awarded a gold disc by the RIAA in July 1972.

In 1973, when their album titled Under the Influence of... Love Unlimited peaked at number 3 on the Billboard Pop Albums chart, Love Unlimited became the first female group to have an album reach the top five since Greatest Hits Vol. 3 from Diana Ross and the Supremes in 1970. The album featured the single "It May Be Winter Outside (But in My Heart It's Spring)" a song originally written by White for Felice Taylor in 1966. It would peak at number 11 on the UK Singles Chart in early 1975.

In 1975, they had their first and only number 1 song, "I Belong to You", which spent a week at the top of the Best Selling Soul Singles Chart. It also peaked at number 27 on the Billboard Hot 100. The song was featured on their third album In Heat which also included a vocal version of "Love's Theme".

In 1977, they were moved to White's own record label Unlimited Gold, recording two further albums He's All I've Got and Love Is Back.

Discography

Albums

Singles

References

External links

American disco girl groups
Musical groups established in 1969
Musical groups disestablished in 1985
Uni Records artists
The Love Unlimited Orchestra members